Light of Life may refer to:

 Light of Life (The Bar-Kays album), 1978
 Light of Life (Sons of Korah album), 1999